Anson Forney Harrold (March 10, 1870 – April 18, 1907) was an American football player and coach.  He served as the first head football coach at the University of Pittsburgh, then known as Western University of Pennsylvania.  He led the school to a 1–4 record in 1893. Aside from coaching, Harrold also played football for Franklin & Marshall College, from which he graduated from in 1889 and Princeton University, where he attended from 1890 until graduating in 1893.

Work outside football
Outside football he worked as a design engineer for 15 years at Westinghouse Electric. He also helped organize the Pittsburgh Transformer Company and worked there for three years. He also became the President of the American Transformer Company, based in Newark, New Jersey.

Family
On September 12, 1893, he married Maude Hubley of Lancaster, Pennsylvania. The couple had one daughter, Elisabeth. Elisabeth married Jesse Gearing Johnson of Bridgton, NJ and they settled in Norfolk, Va.

Death
Harrold died on April 18, 1907, from tuberculosis.  He spent the last year of his life trying to regain his health, spending his last summer and fall in the woods of Maine and his last winter in Camden, South Carolina.

Head coaching record

References

Additional sources
 

1870 births
1907 deaths
19th-century players of American football
American football tackles
Franklin & Marshall Diplomats football players
Pittsburgh Panthers football coaches
Princeton Tigers football players
People from Westmoreland County, Pennsylvania
Players of American football from Pennsylvania
20th-century deaths from tuberculosis
Tuberculosis deaths in Rhode Island